Homeobox protein OTX1 is a protein that in humans is encoded by the OTX1 gene.

Function 

This gene encodes a member of the bicoid sub-family of homeodomain-containing transcription factors. The encoded protein acts as a transcription factor and may play a role in brain and sensory organ development. The Otx gene is active in the region of the first gill arch, which is related to the upper and lower jaw and two of the bones of the ear. A similar protein in mice is required for proper brain and sensory organ development and can cause epilepsy.

References

Further reading

External links 
 

Transcription factors